Manitoba Provincial Road 262 is a provincial road in the western region of the Canadian province of Manitoba.

Route description 

PR 262 begins at PTH 10/PR 354 at Onanole, and terminates at PTH 10/PTH 24 at Tremaine.

The road then continues south for  before reaching the village of Clanwilliam, intersecting PR 357 near Hilltop and eastbound PR 265 just north of Clanwilliam. Along the way, the road meets eastbound PR 471 just south of Clanwilliam.

PR 262 is known as 2nd Avenue S.E. once it enters Minnedosa's town limits.

From PR 465, the road continues south for  before turning west and traveling  to its southbound terminus.

The route is gravel for most its length, with a paved section connecting PR 265 north of Clanwilliam and Minnedosa along with the concurrence it shares with PTH 16A to PTH 16 south of Minnedosa.

History 
The section of PR 262 between its southern terminus and PTH 16/16A was the original route for PTH 10 before its current section was constructed and opened to traffic in 1962. In the early 1990s, the road was widened, smoothed out, and the paved surface was replaced with gravel. As well, the southern terminus was reconfigured to meet PTH 10 and PTH 24 directly using the old PTH 24 extension.

Also in the early 1990s, the Manitoba government decommissioned a number of provincial secondary roads and returned the maintenance of these roads back to the rural municipalities. A small portion of the original PR 262 was included in this decommissioning. However, unlike most provincial roads in which the length was shortened or the route decommissioned altogether, PR 262 was slightly lengthened from its original distance. 

Prior to this, PR 262's northern terminus was at the southeastern boundary of Riding Mountain National Park, where the road continued as Rolling River Road before meeting PTH 19 within the park limits. This section is now a municipal road.

After the decommissioning of the original section, PR 262 was rerouted onto the former PR 263, which was decommissioned in its entirety. PR 262 travels to its current northbound terminus on this section.

See also
List of Manitoba provincial highways

References

262